Vladimir Lopatin (born 1931) is a Soviet former swimmer. He competed in the men's 100 metre backstroke at the 1952 Summer Olympics.

References

External links
 

1931 births
Possibly living people
Soviet male swimmers
Olympic swimmers of the Soviet Union
Swimmers at the 1952 Summer Olympics
Place of birth missing (living people)
Male backstroke swimmers